The 2020 UNIFFAC Women's Tournament is the 1st edition of the UNIFFAC Women's Cup, an association football tournament open to the women's national teams of UNIFFAC member countries. The tournament took place in Equatorial Guinea. three  Of the eight UNIFFAC member countries, Cameroon, Congo and São Tomé and Príncipe chose not to participate in the competition. Equatorial Guinea won the competition  .

Participants

Did Not Enter

Venues

Squads 

DR Congo :
Gabon :

Tournament

Groupe Stage

Final

Final ranking

References 

 
UNIFFAC competitions
2020 in women's association football